A fixed-wing aircraft is a heavier-than-air flying machine, such as an airplane, which is capable of flight using wings that generate lift caused by the aircraft's forward airspeed and the shape of the wings. Fixed-wing aircraft are distinct from rotary-wing aircraft (in which the wings form a rotor mounted on a spinning shaft or "mast"), and ornithopters (in which the wings flap in a manner similar to that of a bird). The wings of a fixed-wing aircraft are not necessarily rigid; kites, hang gliders, variable-sweep wing aircraft and airplanes that use wing morphing are all examples of fixed-wing aircraft.

Gliding fixed-wing aircraft, including free-flying gliders of various kinds and tethered kites, can use moving air to gain altitude. Powered fixed-wing aircraft (airplanes) that gain forward thrust from an engine include powered paragliders, powered hang gliders and some ground effect vehicles. Most fixed-wing aircraft are flown by a pilot on board the craft, but some are specifically designed to be unmanned and controlled either remotely or autonomously (using onboard computers).

History

Early kites
Kites were used approximately 2,800 years ago in China, where materials ideal for kite building were readily available. Some authors hold that leaf kites were being flown much earlier in what is now Sulawesi, based on their interpretation of cave paintings on Muna Island off Sulawesi. By at least 549 AD paper kites were being flown, as it was recorded in that year a paper kite was used as a message for a rescue mission. Ancient and medieval Chinese sources list other uses of kites for measuring distances, testing the wind, lifting men, signaling, and communication for military operations.

Stories of kites were brought to Europe by Marco Polo towards the end of the 13th century, and kites were brought back by sailors from Japan and Malaysia in the 16th and 17th centuries. Although they were initially regarded as mere curiosities, by the 18th and 19th centuries kites were being used as vehicles for scientific research.

Gliders and powered models
This machine may have been suspended for its flight.

One of the earliest purported attempts with gliders was by the 11th-century monk Eilmer of Malmesbury, which ended in failure. A 17th-century account states that the 9th-century poet Abbas Ibn Firnas made a similar attempt, though no earlier sources record this event.

In 1799, Sir George Cayley set forth the concept of the modern airplane as a fixed-wing flying machine with separate systems for lift, propulsion, and control. Cayley was building and flying models of fixed-wing aircraft as early as 1803, and he built a successful passenger-carrying glider in 1853. In 1856, Frenchman Jean-Marie Le Bris made the first powered flight, by having his glider "L'Albatros artificiel" pulled by a horse on a beach. In 1884, the American John J. Montgomery made controlled flights in a glider as a part of a series of gliders built between 1883 and 1886. Other aviators who made similar flights at that time were Otto Lilienthal, Percy Pilcher, and protégés of Octave Chanute.

In the 1890s, Lawrence Hargrave conducted research on wing structures and developed a box kite that lifted the weight of a man. His box kite designs were widely adopted. Although he also developed a type of rotary aircraft engine, he did not create and fly a powered fixed-wing aircraft.

Powered flight

Sir Hiram Maxim built a craft that weighed 3.5 tons, with a 110-foot (34-meter) wingspan that was powered by two 360-horsepower (270-kW) steam engines driving two propellers. In 1894, his machine was tested with overhead rails to prevent it from rising. The test showed that it had enough lift to take off. The craft was uncontrollable, which Maxim, it is presumed, realized, because he subsequently abandoned work on it.

The Wright brothers' flights in 1903 with their Flyer I are recognized by the Fédération Aéronautique Internationale (FAI), the standard setting and record-keeping body for aeronautics, as "the first sustained and controlled heavier-than-air powered flight". By 1905, the Wright Flyer III was capable of fully controllable, stable flight for substantial periods.

In 1906, Brazilian inventor Alberto Santos Dumont designed, built and piloted an aircraft that set the first world record recognized by the Aéro-Club de France by flying the 14 bis  in less than 22 seconds. The flight was certified by the FAI.

The Bleriot VIII design of 1908 was an early aircraft design that had the modern monoplane tractor configuration. It had movable tail surfaces controlling both yaw and pitch, a form of roll control supplied either by wing warping or by ailerons and controlled by its pilot with a joystick and rudder bar. It was an important predecessor of his later Bleriot XI Channel-crossing aircraft of the summer of 1909.

World War I
World War I served as a testbed for the use of the aircraft as a weapon. Aircraft demonstrated their potential as mobile observation platforms, then proved themselves to be machines of war capable of causing casualties to the enemy. The earliest known aerial victory with a synchronized machine gun-armed fighter aircraft occurred in 1915, by German Luftstreitkräfte Leutnant Kurt Wintgens. Fighter aces appeared; the greatest (by number of air victories) was Manfred von Richthofen.

Following World War I, aircraft technology continued to develop. Alcock and Brown crossed the Atlantic non-stop for the first time in 1919. The first commercial flights took place between the United States and Canada in 1919.

Interwar aviation in the "Golden Age"

The so-called Golden Age of Aviation occurred between the two World Wars, during which both updated interpretations of earlier breakthroughs – as with Hugo Junkers' pioneering of all-metal airframes in 1915 leading to giant multi-engined aircraft of up to 60+ meter wingspan sizes by the early 1930s, adoption of the mostly air-cooled radial engine as a practical aircraft powerplant alongside powerful V-12 liquid-cooled aviation engines, and ever-greater instances of long-distance flight attempts – as with a Vickers Vimy in 1919, followed only months later by the U.S. Navy's NC-4 transatlantic flight; culminating in May 1927 with Charles Lindbergh's solo trans-Atlantic flight in the Spirit of St. Louis spurring ever-longer flight attempts, pioneering the way for long-distance flights of the future to become commonplace.

World War II
Airplanes had a presence in all the major battles of World War II. They were an essential component of the military strategies of the period, such as the German Blitzkrieg or the American and Japanese aircraft carrier campaigns of the Pacific.

Military gliders were developed and used in several campaigns, but they did not become widely used due to the high casualty rate often encountered. The Focke-Achgelis Fa 330 Bachstelze (Wagtail) rotor kite of 1942 was notable for its use by German submarines.

Before and during the war, both British and German designers were developing jet engines to power airplanes. The first jet aircraft to fly, in 1939, was the German Heinkel He 178. In 1943, the first operational jet fighter, the Messerschmitt Me 262, went into service with the German Luftwaffe and later in the war the British Gloster Meteor entered service but never saw action – top airspeeds of aircraft for that era went as high as 1,, with the early July 1944 unofficial record flight of the German Me 163B V18 rocket fighter prototype.

Postwar
In October 1947, the Bell X-1 was the first aircraft to exceed the speed of sound.

In 1948–49, aircraft transported supplies during the Berlin Blockade. New aircraft types, such as the B-52, were produced during the Cold War.

The first jet airliner, the de Havilland Comet, was introduced in 1952, followed by the Soviet Tupolev Tu-104 in 1956. The Boeing 707, the first widely successful commercial jet, was in commercial service for more than 50 years, from 1958 to 2010. The Boeing 747 was the world's biggest passenger aircraft from 1970 until it was surpassed by the Airbus A380 in 2005.

Classes of fixed-wing aircraft

Airplane/aeroplane

An airplane (also known as an aeroplane or simply a plane) is a powered fixed-wing aircraft that is propelled forward by thrust from a jet engine or propeller. Planes come in a variety of sizes, shapes, and wing configurations. The broad spectrum of uses for planes includes recreation, transportation of goods and people, military, and research.

Seaplane

A seaplane is a fixed-wing aircraft capable of taking off and landing (alighting) on water. Seaplanes that can also operate from dry land are a subclass called amphibian aircraft. These aircraft were sometimes called hydroplanes. Seaplanes and amphibians are usually divided into two categories based on their technological characteristics: floatplanes and flying boats.

 A floatplane is similar in overall design to a land-based airplane, with a generally unmodified fuselage from as compared to its landplane version, except that the wheels at the base of the undercarriage are replaced by floats, allowing the craft to operate from water rather than from dry land.
 A flying boat is a seaplane with a watertight hull forming the lower (ventral) areas of its fuselage, resting directly on the water's surface. It differs from a float plane as it does not need additional floats for buoyancy, although it may have small underwing floats or fuselage-mount sponsons to stabilize it on the water. Large seaplanes are usually flying boats, with most classic amphibian aircraft designs using some form of flying-boat design for their fuselage/hull.

Powered gliders
Many forms of glider (see below) may be modified by adding a small power plant. These include:
Motor glider – a conventional glider or sailplane with an auxiliary power plant that may be used when in flight to increase performance.
Powered hang glider – a hang glider with a power plant added.
Powered parachute – a paraglider type of parachute with an integrated airframe, seat, undercarriage and power plant hung beneath.
Powered paraglider or paramotor – a paraglider with a power plant suspended behind the pilot.

Ground effect vehicle

A ground effect vehicle (GEV) is a craft that attains level flight near the surface of the earth, making use of the ground effect – an aerodynamic interaction between the wings and the earth's surface. Some GEVs are able to fly higher out of ground effect (OGE) when required – these are classed as powered fixed-wing aircraft.

Glider

A glider is a heavier-than-air craft that is supported in flight by the dynamic reaction of the air against its lifting surfaces, and whose free flight does not depend on an engine. A sailplane is a fixed-wing glider designed for soaring – the ability to gain height in updrafts of air and to fly for long periods.

Gliders are mainly used for recreation, but have also been used for other purposes such as aerodynamics research, warfare and recovering spacecraft.

A motor glider does have an engine for extending its performance and some have engines powerful enough to take off, but the engine is not used in normal flight.

As is the case with planes, there are a wide variety of glider types differing in the construction of their wings, aerodynamic efficiency, location of the pilot and controls. Perhaps the most familiar type is the toy paper plane.

Large gliders are most commonly launched by a tow-plane or by a winch. Military gliders have been used in war to deliver assault troops, and specialized gliders have been used in atmospheric and aerodynamic research. Rocket-powered aircraft and spaceplanes have also made unpowered landings.

Gliders and sailplanes that are used for the sport of gliding have high aerodynamic efficiency. The highest lift-to-drag ratio is 70:1, though 50:1 is more common. After launch, further energy is obtained through the skillful exploitation of rising air in the atmosphere. Flights of thousands of kilometers at average speeds over 200 km/h have been achieved.

The most numerous unpowered aircraft are paper airplanes, a handmade type of glider. Like hang gliders and paragliders, they are foot-launched and are in general slower, smaller, and less expensive than sailplanes. Hang gliders most often have flexible wings given shape by a frame, though some have rigid wings. Paragliders and paper airplanes have no frames in their wings.

Gliders and sailplanes can share a number of features in common with powered aircraft, including many of the same types of fuselage and wing structures. For example, the Horten H.IV was a tailless flying wing glider, and the delta wing-shaped Space Shuttle orbiter flew much like a conventional glider in the lower atmosphere. Many gliders also use similar controls and instruments as powered craft.

Types of glider
 
The main application today of glider aircraft is sport and recreation.

Sailplane

Gliders were developed from the 1920s for recreational purposes. As pilots began to understand how to use rising air, sailplane gliders were developed with a high lift-to-drag ratio. These allowed longer glides to the next source of "lift", and so increase their chances of flying long distances. This gave rise to the popular sport of gliding.

Early gliders were mainly built of wood and metal but the majority of sailplanes now use composite materials incorporating glass, carbon or aramid fibers. To minimize drag, these types have a streamlined fuselage and long narrow wings having a high aspect ratio. Both single-seat and two-seat gliders are available.

Initially training was done by short "hops" in primary gliders which are very basic aircraft with no cockpit and minimal instruments. Since shortly after World War II training has always been done in two-seat dual control gliders, but high performance two-seaters are also used to share the workload and the enjoyment of long flights. Originally skids were used for landing, but the majority now land on wheels, often retractable. Some gliders, known as motor gliders, are designed for unpowered flight, but can deploy piston, rotary, jet or electric engines. Gliders are classified by the FAI for competitions into glider competition classes mainly on the basis of span and flaps.

A class of ultralight sailplanes, including some known as microlift gliders and some known as "airchairs", has been defined by the FAI based on a maximum weight. They are light enough to be transported easily, and can be flown without licensing in some countries. Ultralight gliders have performance similar to hang gliders, but offer some additional crash safety as the pilot can be strapped in an upright seat within a deformable structure. Landing is usually on one or two wheels which distinguishes these craft from hang gliders. Several commercial ultralight gliders have come and gone, but most current development is done by individual designers and home builders.

Military gliders

Military gliders were used during World War II for carrying troops (glider infantry) and heavy equipment to combat zones. The gliders were towed into the air and most of the way to their target by military transport planes, e.g. C-47 Dakota, or by bombers that had been relegated to secondary activities, e.g. Short Stirling. Once released from the tow near the target, they landed as close to the target as possible. The advantage over paratroopers were that heavy equipment could be landed and that the troops were quickly assembled rather than being dispersed over a drop zone. The gliders were treated as disposable, leading to construction from common and inexpensive materials such as wood, though a few were retrieved and re-used. By the time of the Korean War, transport aircraft had also become larger and more efficient so that even light tanks could be dropped by parachute, causing gliders to fall out of favor.

Research gliders
Even after the development of powered aircraft, gliders continued to be used for aviation research. The NASA Paresev Rogallo flexible wing was originally developed to investigate alternative methods of recovering spacecraft. Although this application was abandoned, publicity inspired hobbyists to adapt the flexible-wing airfoil for modern hang gliders.

Initial research into many types of fixed-wing craft, including flying wings and lifting bodies was also carried out using unpowered prototypes.

Hang glider

A hang glider is a glider aircraft in which the pilot is ensconced in a harness suspended from the airframe, and exercises control by shifting body weight in opposition to a control frame. Most modern hang gliders are made of an aluminum alloy or composite-framed fabric wing. Pilots have the ability to soar for hours, gain thousands of meters of altitude in thermal updrafts, perform aerobatics, and glide cross-country for hundreds of kilometers.

Paraglider
A paraglider is a lightweight, free-flying, foot-launched glider aircraft with no rigid primary structure. The pilot sits in a harness suspended below a hollow fabric wing whose shape is formed by its suspension lines, the pressure of air entering vents in the front of the wing and the aerodynamic forces of the air flowing over the outside. Paragliding is most often a recreational activity.

Unmanned gliders
A paper plane is a toy aircraft (usually a glider) made out of paper or paperboard.

Model glider aircraft are models of aircraft using lightweight materials such as polystyrene and balsa wood. Designs range from simple glider aircraft to accurate scale models, some of which can be very large.

Glide bombs are bombs with aerodynamic surfaces to allow a gliding flightpath rather than a ballistic one. This enables the carrying aircraft to attack a heavily defended target from a distance.

Kite

A kite is an aircraft tethered to a fixed point so that the wind blows over its wings. Lift is generated when air flows over the kite's wing, producing low pressure above the wing and high pressure below it, and deflecting the airflow downwards. This deflection also generates horizontal drag in the direction of the wind. The resultant force vector from the lift and drag force components is opposed by the tension of the one or more rope lines or tethers attached to the wing.

Kites are mostly flown for recreational purposes, but have many other uses. Early pioneers such as the Wright Brothers and J.W. Dunne sometimes flew an aircraft as a kite in order to develop it and confirm its flight characteristics, before adding an engine and flight controls, and flying it as an airplane.

Uses

Military applications
Kites have been used for signaling, for delivery of munitions, and for observation, by lifting an observer above the field of battle, and by using kite aerial photography.

Science and meteorology
Kites have been used for scientific purposes, such as Benjamin Franklin's famous experiment proving that lightning is electricity. Kites were the precursors to the traditional aircraft, and were instrumental in the development of early flying craft. Alexander Graham Bell experimented with very large man-lifting kites, as did the Wright brothers and Lawrence Hargrave. Kites had a historical role in lifting scientific instruments to measure atmospheric conditions for weather forecasting.

Radio aerials and light beacons
Kites can be used to carry radio antennas. This method was used for the reception station of the first transatlantic transmission by Marconi. Captive balloons may be more convenient for such experiments, because kite-carried antennas require a lot of wind, which may be not always possible with heavy equipment and a ground conductor.

Kites can be used to carry light effects such as lightsticks or battery powered lights.

Kite traction

Kites can be used to pull people and vehicles downwind. Efficient foil-type kites such as power kites can also be used to sail upwind under the same principles as used by other sailing craft, provided that lateral forces on the ground or in the water are redirected as with the keels, center boards, wheels and ice blades of traditional sailing craft. In the last two decades, several kite sailing sports have become popular, such as kite buggying, kite landboarding, kite boating and kite surfing. Snow kiting has also become popular.

Kite sailing opens several possibilities not available in traditional sailing:

 Wind speeds are greater at higher altitudes
 Kites may be manoeuvered dynamically, which dramatically increases the available force
 There is no need for mechanical structures to withstand bending forces; vehicles or hulls can be very light or dispensed with altogether

Power generation

Conceptual research and development projects are being undertaken by over a hundred participants to investigate the use of kites in harnessing high altitude wind currents for electricity generation.

Cultural uses 
Kite festivals are a popular form of entertainment throughout the world. They include local events, traditional festivals and major international festivals.

Designs

Bermuda kite
Bowed kite, e.g. Rokkaku
Cellular or box kite
Chapi-chapi
Delta kite
Foil, parafoil or bow kite
Malay kite see also wau bulan
Tetrahedral kite

Types

Expanded polystyrene kite
Fighter kite
Indoor kite
Inflatable single-line kite
Kytoon
Man-lifting kite
Rogallo parawing kite
Stunt (sport) kite
Water kite

Characteristics

Airframe

The structural parts of a fixed-wing aircraft are called the airframe. The parts present can vary according to the aircraft's type and purpose. Early types were usually made of wood with fabric wing surfaces, When engines became available for a powered flight around a hundred years ago, their mounts were made of metal. Then as speeds increased more and more parts became metal until by the end of World War II all-metal aircraft were common. In modern times, increasing use of composite materials has been made.

Typical structural parts include:

 One or more large horizontal wings, often with an airfoil cross-section shape. The wing deflects air downward as the aircraft moves forward, generating lifting force to support it in flight. The wing also provides stability in roll to stop the aircraft from rolling to the left or right in steady flight.

 A fuselage, a long, thin body, usually with tapered or rounded ends to make its shape aerodynamically smooth. The fuselage joins the other parts of the airframe and usually contains important things such as the pilot, payload and flight systems.
 A vertical stabilizer or fin is a vertical wing-like surface mounted at the rear of the plane and typically protruding above it. The fin stabilizes the plane's yaw (turn left or right) and mounts the rudder which controls its rotation along that axis.
 A horizontal stabilizer, usually mounted at the tail near the vertical stabilizer. The horizontal stabilizer is used to stabilize the plane's pitch (tilt up or down) and mounts the elevators which provide pitch control.
 Landing gear, a set of wheels, skids, or floats that support the plane while it is on the surface. On seaplanes, the bottom of the fuselage or floats (pontoons) support it while on the water. On some planes, the landing gear retracts during the flight to reduce drag.

Wings
The wings of a fixed-wing aircraft are static planes extending to either side of the aircraft. When the aircraft travels forwards, 
air flows over the wings which are shaped to create lift.

Wing structure

Kites and some light weight gliders and airplanes have flexible wing surfaces which are stretched across a frame and made rigid by the lift forces exerted by the airflow over them. Larger aircraft have rigid wing surfaces which provide additional strength.

Whether flexible or rigid, most wings have a strong frame to give them their shape and to transfer lift from the wing surface to the rest of the aircraft. The main structural elements are one or more spars running from root to tip, and many ribs running from the leading (front) to the trailing (rear) edge.

Early airplane engines had little power and light weight was very important. Also, early aerofoil sections were very thin, and could not have strong frame installed within. So until the 1930s, most wings were too light weight to have enough strength and external bracing struts and wires were added. When the available engine power increased during the 1920s and 1930s, wings could be made heavy and strong enough that bracing was not needed anymore. This type of unbraced wing is called a cantilever wing.

Wing configuration

The number and shape of the wings vary widely on different types. A given wing plane may be full-span or divided by a central fuselage into port (left) and starboard (right) wings. Occasionally, even more, wings have been used, with the three-winged triplane achieving some fame in World War I. The four-winged quadruplane and other multiplane designs have had little success.

A monoplane, which derives from the prefix, mono means one which means it has a single wing plane, a biplane has two stacked one above the other, a tandem wing has two placed one behind the other. When the available engine power increased during the 1920s and 1930s and bracing was no longer needed, the unbraced or cantilever monoplane became the most common form of powered type.

The wing planform is the shape when seen from above. To be aerodynamically efficient, a wing should be straight with a long span from side to side but have a short chord (high aspect ratio). But to be structurally efficient, and hence lightweight, a wing must have a short span but still enough area to provide lift (low aspect ratio).

At transonic speeds, near the speed of sound, it helps to sweep the wing backward or forwards to reduce drag from supersonic shock waves as they begin to form. The swept wing is just a straight wing swept backward or forwards.

The delta wing is a triangle shape which may be used for a number of reasons. As a flexible Rogallo wing it allows a stable shape under aerodynamic forces, and so is often used for kites and other ultralight craft. As a supersonic wing, it combines high strength with low drag and so is often used for fast jets.

A variable geometry wing can be changed in flight to a different shape. The variable-sweep wing transforms between an efficient straight configuration for takeoff and landing, to a low-drag swept configuration for high-speed flight. Other forms of variable planform have been flown, but none have gone beyond the research stage.

Fuselage

A fuselage is a long, thin body, usually with tapered or rounded ends to make its shape aerodynamically smooth. Most fixed-wing aircraft have a single fuselage, often referred to as simply "the body". Others may have two or more fuselages, or the fuselage may be fitted with booms on either side of the tail to allow the extreme rear of the fuselage to be utilized.

The fuselage may contain a flight crew, passengers, cargo or payload, fuel and engine(s). Pilotless aircraft (drones) do not usually have a pilot or any other flight crew or passengers on board. Gliders usually have no fuel or engines, although some variations such as motor gliders and rocket gliders have them for temporary or optional use.

Pilots of manned fixed-wing aircraft usually control them from inside a cockpit, usually located at the front or top of the fuselage, equipped with controls and usually windows and instruments. Aircraft often have two or more pilots, with one in overall command (the "pilot") and one or more "co-pilots". On larger aircraft a navigator is typically also seated in the cockpit as well. Some military or specialized aircraft may have other flight crew members in the cockpit as well.

In small aircraft, the passengers are typically seated behind the pilot(s) in the same cabin, although occasionally a passenger seat may be beside or even in front of the pilot. Larger passenger aircraft have a separate passenger cabin or occasionally cabins which are physically separated from the cockpit.

Wings vs. bodies

Flying wing

A flying wing is a tailless aircraft which has no definite fuselage, with most of the crew, payload and equipment being housed inside the main wing structure.

The flying wing configuration was studied extensively in the 1930s and 1940s, notably by Jack Northrop and Cheston L. Eshelman in the United States, and Alexander Lippisch and the Horten brothers in Germany.
After the war, a number of experimental designs were based on the flying wing concept. Some general interest continued until the early 1950s, but designs did not necessarily offer a great advantage in range and presented a number of technical problems, leading to the adoption of "conventional" solutions like the Convair B-36 and the B-52 Stratofortress. Due to the practical need for a deep wing, the flying wing concept is most practical for designs in the slow-to-medium speed range, and there has been continual interest in using it as a tactical airlifter design.

Interest in flying wings was renewed in the 1980s due to their potentially low radar reflection cross-sections. Stealth technology relies on shapes which only reflect radar waves in certain directions, thus making the aircraft hard to detect unless the radar receiver is at a specific position relative to the aircraft – a position that changes continuously as the aircraft moves. This approach eventually led to the Northrop B-2 Spirit stealth bomber. In this case the aerodynamic advantages of the flying wing are not the primary needs. However, modern computer-controlled fly-by-wire systems allowed for many of the aerodynamic drawbacks of the flying wing to be minimized, making for an efficient and stable long-range bomber.

Blended wing body

Blended wing body aircraft have a flattened and airfoil shaped body, which produces most of the lift to keep itself aloft, and distinct and separate wing structures, though the wings are smoothly blended in with the body.

Thus blended wing bodied aircraft incorporate design features from both a futuristic fuselage and flying wing design. The purported advantages of the blended wing body approach are efficient high-lift wings and a wide airfoil-shaped body. This enables the entire craft to contribute to lift generation with the result of potentially increased fuel economy.

Lifting body

A lifting body is a configuration in which the body itself produces lift. In contrast to a flying wing, which is a wing with minimal or no conventional fuselage, a lifting body can be thought of as a fuselage with little or no conventional wing. Whereas a flying wing seeks to maximize cruise efficiency at subsonic speeds by eliminating non-lifting surfaces, lifting bodies generally minimize the drag and structure of a wing for subsonic, supersonic, and hypersonic flight, or, spacecraft re-entry. All of these flight regimes pose challenges for proper flight stability.

Lifting bodies were a major area of research in the 1960s and 1970s as a means to build a small and lightweight manned spacecraft. The US built a number of famous lifting body rocket planes to test the concept, as well as several rocket-launched re-entry vehicles that were tested over the Pacific. Interest waned as the US Air Force lost interest in the manned mission, and major development ended during the Space Shuttle design process when it became clear that the highly shaped fuselages made it difficult to fit fuel tankage.

Empennage and foreplane

The classic aerofoil section wing is unstable in flight and difficult to control. Flexible-wing types often rely on an anchor line or the weight of a pilot hanging beneath to maintain the correct attitude. Some free-flying types use an adapted aerofoil that is stable, or other ingenious mechanisms including, most recently, electronic artificial stability.

But in order to achieve trim, stability and control, most fixed-wing types have an empennage comprising a fin and rudder which act horizontally and a tailplane and elevator which act vertically. This is so common that it is known as the conventional layout. Sometimes there may be two or more fins, spaced out along the tailplane.

Some types have a horizontal "canard" foreplane ahead of the main wing, instead of behind it. This foreplane may contribute to the trim, stability or control of the aircraft, or to several of these.

Aircraft controls

Kite control
Kites are controlled by wires running down to the ground. Typically each wire acts as a tether to the part of the kite it is attached to.

Free-flying aircraft controls
Gliders and airplanes have more complex control systems, especially if they are piloted.

The main controls allow the pilot to direct the aircraft in the air. Typically these are:
The yoke or joystick controls rotation of the plane about the pitch and roll axes. A yoke resembles a steering wheel, and a control stick is a joystick. The pilot can pitch the plane down by pushing on the yoke or stick, and pitch the plane up by pulling on it. Rolling the plane is accomplished by turning the yoke in the direction of the desired roll, or by tilting the control stick in that direction.
Rudder pedals control rotation of the plane about the yaw axis. There are two pedals that pivot so that when one is pressed forward the other moves backward, and vice versa. The pilot presses on the right rudder pedal to make the plane yaw to the right, and pushes on the left pedal to make it yaw to the left. The rudder is used mainly to balance the plane in turns, or to compensate for winds or other effects that tend to turn the plane about the yaw axis.
On powered types, an engine stop control ("fuel cutoff", for example) and, usually, a Throttle or thrust lever and other controls, such as a fuel-mixture control (to compensate for air density changes with altitude change).

Other common controls include:
Flap levers, which are used to control the deflection position of flaps on the wings.
Spoiler levers, which are used to control the position of spoilers on the wings, and to arm their automatic deployment in planes designed to deploy them upon landing. The spoilers reduce lift for landing.
Trim controls, which usually take the form of knobs or wheels and are used to adjust pitch, roll, or yaw trim. These are often connected to small airfoils on the trail edge of the control surfaces called "trim tabs". Trim is used to reduce the amount of pressure on the control forces needed to maintain a steady course.
On wheeled types, Brakes are used to slow and stop the plane on the ground, and sometimes for turns on the ground.

A craft may have two pilots' seats with dual controls, allowing two pilots to take turns. This is often used for training or for longer flights.

The control system may allow full or partial automation of flight, such as an autopilot, a wing leveler, or a flight management system. An unmanned aircraft has no pilot but is controlled remotely or via means such as gyroscopes or other forms of autonomous control.

Cockpit instrumentation
On manned fixed-wing aircraft, instruments provide information to the pilots, including flight, engines, navigation, communications, and other aircraft systems that may be installed.

The six basic instruments, sometimes referred to as the "six pack", are as follows:
 The airspeed indicator (ASI) shows the speed at which the plane is moving through the surrounding air.
 The attitude indicator (AI), sometimes called the artificial horizon, indicates the exact orientation of the aircraft about its pitch and roll axes.
 The altimeter indicates the altitude or height of the plane above mean sea level (AMSL).
 The vertical speed indicator (VSI), or variometer, shows the rate at which the plane is climbing or descending.
 The heading indicator (HI), sometimes called the directional gyro (DG), shows the magnetic compass direction that the plane's fuselage is pointing towards. The actual direction the plane is flying towards is affected by the wind conditions.
 The turn coordinator (TC), or turn and bank indicator, helps the pilot to control the plane in a coordinated attitude while turning.

Other cockpit instruments might include:
 A two-way radio, to enable communications with other planes and with air traffic control. Airplanes built before World War II may not have been equipped with a radio but they are practically essential now in case of emergency.
 A horizontal situation indicator (HSI), to indicate the position and movement of the plane as seen from above with respect to the ground, including course/heading and other information.
 Instruments showing the status of each of the plane's engines (operating speed, thrust, temperature, and other variables).
 Combined display systems such as primary flight displays or navigation aids.
 Information displays such as onboard weather radar displays.
 A radio direction finder (RDF), to indicate the direction to one or more radio beacons, which can be used to determine the plane's position.
 A satellite navigation (satnav) system, to provide an accurate position.

See also

 Aircraft flight mechanics
 Airliner
 Aviation
 Aviation and the environment
 Aviation history
 Fuel efficiency
 List of altitude records reached by different aircraft types
 Maneuvering speed
 Rotorcraft

References

Notes
 In 1903, when the Wright brothers used the word, "aeroplane" (a British English term that can also mean airplane in American English) meant wing, not the whole aircraft. See text of their patent. Patent 821,393 – Wright brothers' patent for "Flying Machine"

Citations

Bibliography
 Blatner, David. The Flying Book: Everything You've Ever Wondered About Flying on Airplanes.

External links

 The airplane centre
 Airliners.net
 Aerospaceweb.org
 How Airplanes Work – Howstuffworks.com
 Smithsonian National Air and Space Museum's How Things Fly website
"Hops and Flights – a Roll Call of Early Powered Take-offs" a 1959 Flight article

(Wayback Machine copy)

Aircraft configurations
Articles containing video clips